National Route 11 (officially, PY11, simply known as Ruta Once) is a highway in Paraguay, which runs from Antequera to Capitán Bado.

Distances, cities and towns

The following table shows the distances traversed by National Route 11 in each different department, showing cities and towns that it passes by (or near).

In their 2011 book of correspondence Five Years, authors Christian Kracht and David Woodard discuss traveling along Route 11 to and from Nueva Germania. In Die Südharzreise, Woodard discusses Route 11 in comparison to Bundesautobahn 38 and U.S. Route 66.

References

11
San Pedro Department, Paraguay